In chemistry, a color reaction or colour reaction is a chemical reaction that is used to transform colorless chemical compounds into colored derivatives which can be detected visually or with the aid of a colorimeter.

The concentration of a colorless solution cannot normally be determined with a colorimeter.  The addition of a color reagent leads to a color reaction and the absorbance of the colored product can then be measured with a colorimeter.

A change in absorbance in the ultraviolet range cannot be detected by eye but can be measured by a suitably equipped colorimeter.  A special colorimeter is required because standard colorimeters cannot operate below a wavelength of 400 nanometers.  It is also necessary to use fused quartz cuvettes because glass is opaque to ultraviolet.

Color reagents
Many different color reagents have been developed for determining the concentrations of different substances. For example, Nessler's reagent can be used to determine the concentration of a solution of ammonia.

Thin layer chromatography
In thin layer chromatography (TLC) color reactions are frequently used to detect compound spots by dipping the plate into the reagent or by spraying the reagent onto the plates.

See also
 Blood sugar
 Colorimeter
 Derivatization
 MBAS assay

References

Chemical reactions